Basket-Ball Club Sparta Bertrange, also known as simply Sparta, is a Luxembourgian professional basketball team from Bertrange. The club plays in the Total League, the highest level of the national championship.
The last few years Sparta is known for its good youth Teams as they have won several Championships. The basketball education for youth is at a very high-level compared to the rest of Luxembourg.

History
Sparta was founded in 1935 and is one of the clubs with the most titles in the high level domestic league. The colors of the club are red and white. The en "Atert" has a capacity of 2,000 seats.

Honours
Luxembourgian League
Winners (11): 1957–58, 1959–60, 1968–69, 1973–74, 1978–79, 1985–86, 1986–87, 2004–05, 2006–07, 2007–08, 2011–12
Luxembourgian Cup
Winners (5): 1959–60, 1972–73, 1984–85, 1996–97, 2009–10

Headcoaches since 2000 
 2000-2004 : Toni Ostojic
 2004-2007 : Michel Baiverlin
 january 2007 - Mai 2007 : Olaf Stolz
 2007-2009 :  Philippe Giberti
 december 2009 :  Christophe Flammang (intérim)
 january 2010 - Juillet 2010 :  Doug Marty
 2010-2011 :  Olaf Stolz
 2011- january 2014 : Rainer Kloss
 january 2014 - Juillet 2014 :  Doug Marty
 2014 - january 2015 : Bob Adam
 january 2015 - 2017 :  Philippe Giberti
2017-2018: Arnaud Ricoux
2018:  Jason Price
2018 - 2020 :  Kevin Magdowski
2020-2021:  Pascal Meurs
2021-2022 (november):  Chris Wulff
2022 (déc.) - present:  Christophe Flammang

External links
 Official website
 Luxembourg Basketball Federation site

Basketball teams in Luxembourg
Bertrange
Basketball teams established in 1935